Waterloo is a Charleroi Metro station, located at the northern end of Charleroi downtown, in fare zone 1.

The station has 3 street entrances (two on each side of the Jules Hénin Avenue, one on the Jules Hiérnaux Square), leading to the lowest level. Platforms are located on the upper level and are accessible through escalators and stairs.

The station has one lateral platform which is currently not used (and not connected to any tram tracks). All current lines use a central platform. Waterloo is also the starting point of the partially built but unused Centenaire line.

Starting from Waterloo is a short track section running to the North and surfacing north of the Jules Hiérnaux Square, which would have been the starting point of pre-metro lines to Lodelinsart and Gosselies on one side, and Ransart and Heppignies on the other side. (A tram line to Gosselies, beginning at Piges, has been built since.)

The station features an extensive track network, allowing light rail vehicles to pass the station and reverse the travel direction by entering it from opposite direction (first bypassing it by a passing loop) or by travelling back after departing the station using a passing loop.

On the initial project plan for the Charleroi Pre-metro, the Waterloo station was called Nord (French for North).

Nearby points of interest 
 In the middle of the nearby Jules Hiérnaux Square is a Marsupilami statue which is a well-known Charleroi landmark. 
 Notre-Dame (Our Lady) hospital.
 Université du Travail Higher education school.
 Ville 2 Mall

Transfers  
TEC Charleroi bus lines 4, 37, 71, 74, 722 and City-Bus.

Charleroi Metro stations
Railway stations opened in 1992